Methylammonium chloride in an organic halide with a formula of CH3NH3Cl. It is an ammonium salt composed of methylamine and hydrogen chloride. One potential application for the methylammonium halides is in the production of perovskite solar cells.

References 

Methylammonium compounds
Chlorides